Namphon Nongkeepahuyuth (May 19, 1969 – September 19, 2016) is a late Thai Muay Thai kickboxer. He fought and was famous in the 1980s. He is also elder brother of another famous Muay Thai kickboxer Namkabuan Nongkeepahuyuth.

Biography and career
Namphon (nickname: Khaek; แขก) was born on 19 May 1969 in Tambon Jan Tuek,  Nong Ki District, Buriram Province. He practiced Muay Thai as a child with a training and supporting from Pramote Hoymook, a local physical education teacher who owns a Muay Thai gym "Nongkeepahuyuth". He became successful and famous in Surin and Nakhon Ratchasima before going to fight in Bangkok where he become a Muay Thai superstar from 1988–1991.

He fought with many famous Muay Thai kickboxers at that time, such as Samart Payakaroon, Cherry Sor Wanich, Sangtiennoi Sor.Rungroj, Petdum Look Borai, Panomtoanlek Sor. Sirinan, Neutharonee Tongraja, Superlek Sorn E-Sarn, Jaroenthong Kiatbanchong, Samranthong Kiatbanchong, Pompetch Naratreekul, Orono Por Muang Ubon, and especially with Cherry Sor Wanich who is considered his main rival, and Samart Payakaroon who he fought five times though he only beat him once.

He won championships of Lumpinee Stadium at Junior flyweight (108 lbs), Flyweight (112 lbs), and Featherweight (126 lbs). He often fought as the main event in the title "Suek Onesongchai" by Songchai Rattanasuban as promoter. His highest salary was 240,000–260,000 baht. Namphon was a favourite with Muay Thai fans due to his fighting style, and especially for his fiercest weapon, a knee strike, for which he was given the nickname "Decayed face knee striker" because of his prowess at knees and because he often had bloody wounds after his fights, especially on his face or eyebrows. Throughout his career it was recorded that he had been given 268 stitches and at one time as many 72 stitches.

In 1990 he fought against Ramon Dekkers of the Netherlands twice. In the first bout, he was defeated by unanimous decision in Amsterdam, Netherlands, but he won the second fight at Lumpinee Stadium, Bangkok.

Retirement and death
In 1993, he suffered a car accident, while still at the high point of his fighting career. He retired two years later at 26 years old.

After retirement, he opened a short-lived mu kratha restaurant in Nakhon Ratchasima. Later, he returned to live in his native Buriram, living a simple life and training children in muay Thai in his old gym.

In 2013, he became ill with pneumonitis from too much drinking and smoking for many years, until his body became very thin. He died at Nang Rong Hospital at 17:00 on 19 September 2016, when he was 47 years old.

Titles
Lumpinee Stadium
 1986 Lumpinee Stadium 108 lbs Champion
 1987 Lumpinee Stadium 112 lbs Champion
 1989 Lumpinee Stadium 126 lbs Champion (defended twice)

Muay Thai record

|-  style="background:#fbb;"
| 1995-09-02 || Loss||align=left| Jompoplek Sor.Sumalee ||  || Ubon Ratchathani, Thailand || Decision || 5 || 3:00
|-  style="background:#fbb;"
| 1995-07-21 || Loss||align=left| Rainbow Sor Prantalay || Lumpinee Stadium || Bangkok, Thailand || Decision || 5 || 3:00
|-  style="background:#fbb;"
| 1995-03-29 || Loss||align=left| Kongnapa BM Service || Rajadamnern Stadium || Bangkok, Thailand || KO (High kick) || 5 ||
|-  style="background:#fbb;"
| 1995-01-09 || Loss||align=left| Rainbow Sor Prantalay || Rajadamnern Stadium || Bangkok, Thailand || KO (High kick)|| 4 ||
|-  style="background:#fbb;"
| 1994- || Loss ||align=left| Orono Por Muang Ubon || Lumpinee Stadium || Bangkok, Thailand || Decision || 5 || 3:00
|-  style="background:#cfc;"
| 1994-|| Win||align=left| Chandet Sor Prantalay|| Lumpinee Stadium  || Bangkok, Thailand || Decision || 5 || 3:00
|-  style="background:#cfc;"
| 1994- || Win||align=left| Pompetch Nratrikul || Lumpinee Stadium || Bangkok, Thailand || Decision || 5 || 3:00
|-  style="background:#fbb;"
| 1994-|| Loss||align=left| Chandet Sor Prantalay|| Lumpinee Stadium  || Bangkok, Thailand || Decision || 5 || 3:00
|-  style="background:#cfc;"
| 1994-05-31 || Win||align=left| Pompetch Nratrikul || Lumpinee Stadium || Bangkok, Thailand || Decision || 5 || 3:00
|-  style="background:#cfc;"
| 1994-04-22 || Win||align=left| Pompetch Nratrikul || Lumpinee Stadium || Bangkok, Thailand || Decision || 5 || 3:00
|-  style="background:#fbb;"
| 1994-03-29 || Loss||align=left| Kongnapa BM Service || Lumpinee Stadium || Bangkok, Thailand || Decision || 5 || 3:00
|-  style="background:#cfc;"
| 1994-03- || Win||align=left| Taweechai Wor.Preecha || Rajadamnern Stadium || Bangkok, Thailand || Decision || 5 || 3:00

|-  style="background:#cfc;"
| 1994-02- || Win||align=left| Sisod Kiatchitchanok|| Rajadamnern Stadium || Bangkok, Thailand || Decision || 5 || 3:00

|-  style="background:#cfc;"
| 1994-01- || Win||align=left| Wanlop Sor.Thepthong || Rajadamnern Stadium || Bangkok, Thailand || KO|| 1 ||

|-  style="background:#cfc;"
| 1993-12-23 || Win ||align=left| Orono Por Muang Ubon || Lumpinee Stadium || Bangkok, Thailand || Decision || 5 || 3:00
|-  style="background:#fbb;"
| 1993-11-23 || Loss||align=left| Pompetch Naratreekul || Lumpinee Stadium || Bangkok, Thailand || Decision || 5 || 3:00
|-  style="background:#cfc;"
| 1993-10-22 || Win ||align=left| Kaonar Sor Kettalingchan || Lumpinee Stadium || Bangkok, Thailand || Decision || 5 || 3:00
|-  style="background:#fbb;"
| 1992-09-11 || Loss ||align=left| Buakaw Por Pisichet || Lumpinee Stadium || Bangkok, Thailand || Decision|| 5 || 3:00
|-  style="background:#fbb;"
| 1992-08-07 || Loss ||align=left| Superlek Sorn E-Sarn || Lumpinee Stadium || Bangkok, Thailand || KO || 4 ||
|-  style="background:#fbb;"
| 1991-12- || Loss ||align=left| Sangtiennoi Sor.Rungroj || Lumpinee Stadium || Bangkok, Thailand || Decision || 5 || 3:00
|-  style="background:#fbb;"
| 1991-11-26 || Loss ||align=left| Sangtiennoi Sor.Rungroj || Lumpinee Stadium || Bangkok, Thailand || Decision || 5 || 3:00
|-  style="background:#cfc;"
| 1991- || Win ||align=left| Sanit Wichitkriangkrai || || New Zealand || Decision || 5 || 3:00
|-  style="background:#cfc;"
| 1991-10-15 || Win ||align=left| Sanit Wichitkriangkrai || Lumpinee Stadium || Bangkok, Thailand || Decision || 5 || 3:00
|-  style="background:#cfc;"
| 1991-08-14 || Win ||align=left| Jaroenthong Kiatbanchong || Rajadamnern Stadium || Bangkok, Thailand || Decision || 5 || 3:00
|-  style="background:#fbb;"
| 1991-07-30 || Loss ||align=left| Superlek Sorn E-Sarn || Lumpinee Stadium || Bangkok, Thailand || Decision  || 5 || 3:00
|-  style="background:#cfc;"
| 1991-06-28 || Win ||align=left| Panomrunglek Chor.Sawat || Lumpinee Stadium || Bangkok, Thailand || Decision || 5 || 3:00
|-  style="background:#cfc;"
| 1991-06-14 || Win ||align=left| Nongmoon Chomputhong || Lumpinee Stadium || Bangkok, Thailand || Decision || 5 || 3:00
|-  style="background:#fbb;"
| 1991-03-29 || Loss ||align=left| Superlek Sorn E-Sarn || Lumpinee Stadium || Bangkok, Thailand || Decision  || 5 || 3:00
|-  style="background:#cfc;"
| 1991-03-01 || Win ||align=left| Therdkiat Sitthepitak || Lumpinee Stadium || Bangkok, Thailand || KO || 4 ||
|-  style="background:#cfc;"

| 1991- || Win ||align=left| Petchdam Lukborai || Lumpinee Stadium || Bangkok, Thailand || Decision  || 5 || 3:00
|-  style="background:#c5d2ea;"
| 1991-02-09 || Draw||align=left| Nuathoranee Sor.Kettalingchan || Lumpinee Stadium || Bangkok, Thailand || Decision  || 5 || 3:00
|-  style="background:#cfc;"
| 1991-01-21 || Win||align=left| Nuathoranee Sor.Kettalingchan || Lumpinee Stadium || Bangkok, Thailand || Decision  || 5 || 3:00
|-  style="background:#cfc;"
| 1990-12-15 || Win||align=left| Chumpuang Chomphuong ||  || Tokyo || KO || 2 ||
|-  style="background:#fbb;"
| 1990-10-26 || Loss||align=left| Panomrunglek Chor.Sawat ||  || Bangkok, Thailand || KO|| 4 ||
|-  style="background:#fbb;"
| 1990-08-15 || Loss||align=left| Kongnapa Luktapfah || Rajadamnern Stadium || Bangkok, Thailand || KO|| 1 ||
|-  style="background:#cfc;"
| 1990-07-29 || Win||align=left| Dennis Sigo ||  || England || TKO (low kick) || 4 ||
|-  style="background:#fbb;"
| 1990-06-29 || Loss||align=left| Superlek Sorn E-Sarn || Lumpinee Stadium || Bangkok, Thailand || Decision  || 5 || 3:00
|-  style="background:#fbb;"
| 1990-05-18 || Loss||align=left| Petchdam Sor.Bodin || MAJKF || Tokyo, Japan || Decision|| 5 || 3:00
|-  style="background:#cfc;"
| 1990-04-20 || Win ||align=left| Ramon Dekkers || Lumpinee Stadium || Bangkok, Thailand || Decision  || 5 || 3:00
|-  style="background:#fbb;"
| 1990-03-30 || Loss||align=left| Petchdam Sor.Bodin || Lumpinee Stadium || Bangkok, Thailand || Decision|| 5 || 3:00 
|-
! style=background:white colspan=9 |
|-  style="background:#fbb;"
| 1990-02-18 || Loss ||align=left| Ramon Dekkers || || Amsterdam, Netherlands || Decision (Unanimous) || 5 || 3:00 
|-
! style=background:white colspan=9 |
|-  style="background:#fbb;"
| 1990-02-06 || Loss||align=left| Cherry Sor Wanich|| Lumpinee Stadium || Bangkok, Thailand || Decision|| 5 || 3:00
|-  style="background:#c5d2ea;"
| 1990-01-19 || Draw ||align=left| Cherry Sor Wanich|| Lumpinee Stadium || Bangkok, Thailand || Decision|| 5 || 3:00
|-  style="background:#cfc;"
| 1989-12-31 || Win ||align=left| Pascal Gregoire || || Paris, France || TKO (Low kick)|| 4 ||
|-  style="background:#c5d2ea;"
| 1989-11-28 || Draw ||align=left| Cherry Sor Wanich|| Lumpinee Stadium || Bangkok, Thailand || Decision|| 5 || 3:00
|-  style="background:#c5d2ea;"
| 1989-11-07 || Draw ||align=left| Cherry Sor Wanich|| Lumpinee Stadium || Bangkok, Thailand || Decision|| 5 || 3:00
|-  style="background:#cfc;"
| 1989-10-06 || Win ||align=left| Jaroenthong Kiatbanchong|| Lumpinee Stadium || Bangkok, Thailand || Decision|| 5 || 3:00 
|-
! style=background:white colspan=9 |
|-  style="background:#cfc;"
| 1989-09-08 || Win ||align=left| Chanchai Sor Tamarangsri|| Lumpinee Stadium || Bangkok, Thailand || Decision|| 5 || 3:00
|-  style="background:#cfc;"
| 1989-08-15 || Win ||align=left| Manasak Sor Ploenchit|| Lumpinee Stadium|| Bangkok, Thailand || Decision|| 5 || 3:00
|-  style="background:#fbb;"
| 1989-06-26 || Loss ||align=left| Cherry Sor Wanich|| Rajadamnern Stadium || Bangkok, Thailand || Decision|| 5 || 3:00
|-  style="background:#cfc;"
| 1989-05-30 || Win ||align=left| Sanphet Lokrangsee || Lumpinee Stadium || Bangkok, Thailand || Decision|| 5 || 3:00 
|-
! style=background:white colspan=9 |
|-  style="background:#fbb;"
| 1989-04-07 || Loss ||align=left| Jaroenthong Kiatbanchong|| Lumpinee Stadium || Bangkok, Thailand || TKO || 3 ||
|-  style="background:#cfc;"
| 1989-03-10 || Win ||align=left| Jaroenthong Kiatbanchong|| Lumpinee Stadium || Bangkok, Thailand || Decision|| 5 || 3:00 
|-
! style=background:white colspan=9 |
|-  style="background:#fbb;"
| 1989-01-23 || Loss||align=left| Jomwo Chenyim|| Rajadamnern Stadium  || Bangkok, Thailand || Decision|| 5 || 3:00
|-  style="background:#c5d2ea;"
| 1989-01-06 || Draw||align=left| Jomwo Chenyim||  Lumpinee Stadium || Bangkok, Thailand || Decision|| 5 || 3:00
|-  style="background:#fbb;"
| 1988-12-02 || Loss ||align=left| Samart Payakaroon || Lumpinee Stadium || Bangkok, Thailand || Decision || 5 || 3:00

|-  style="background:#fbb;"
| 1988-10-28 || Loss ||align=left| Samart Payakaroon || Lumpinee Stadium || Bangkok, Thailand || TKO (Doctor Stoppage) || 3 ||
|-  style="background:#cfc;"
| 1988-08-05 || Win ||align=left| Kongtoranee Payakaroon || Lumpinee Stadium || Bangkok, Thailand || Decision || 5 || 3:00
|-  style="background:#cfc;"
| 1988-07-26 || Win ||align=left| Kongtoranee Payakaroon || Lumpinee Stadium || Bangkok, Thailand || Decision || 5 || 3:00

|-  style="background:#cfc;"
| 1988-06-24|| Win ||align=left| Manasak Sor Ploenchit || Lumpinee Stadium || Bangkok, Thailand || Decision || 5 || 3:00

|- style="background:#fbb;"
| 1988-05-03 || Loss ||align=left| Panomtuanlek Hapalang || Lumpinee Stadium ||  Bangkok, Thailand  || TKO (Knees)|| 3 || 
|-
! style=background:white colspan=9 |
|-  style="background:#c5d2ea;"
| 1988-03-04 || Draw||align=left| Jomwo Chenyim|| Lumpinee Stadium || Bangkok, Thailand || Decision|| 5 || 3:00
|-  style="background:#cfc;"
| 1988-01-26 || Win ||align=left| Sanit Wichitkiriangkrai || Lumpinee Stadium || Bangkok, Thailand || TKO (dislocated shoulder) || 4 ||
|-  style="background:#cfc;"
| 1987-12-29 || Win||align=left| Sanphet Loukrangsee||  Lumpinee Stadium  || Bangkok, Thailand || Decision || 5 || 3:00
|-  style="background:#fbb;"
| 1987-11-23 || Loss ||align=left| Wanpichit Kaennorasing ||  || Buriram, Thailand || KO || 3 ||

|-  style="background:#cfc;"
| 1987-09-22 || Win ||align=left| Phayannoi Sor.Tassanee || Lumpinee Stadium || Bangkok, Thailand || Decision || 5 || 3:00

|-  style="background:#cfc;"
| 1987-07-31 || Win ||align=left| Daotongnoi Sityodtong || Lumpinee Stadium || Bangkok, Thailand || Decision || 5 || 3:00

|-  style="background:#c5d2ea;"
| 1987-06-17 || Draw||align=left| Jaroenthong Kiatbanchong || Lumpinee Stadium || Bangkok, Thailand ||  Decision || 5 || 3:00

|-  style="background:#fbb;"
| 1987-03-26 || Loss ||align=left| Jaroenthong Kiatbanchong || Lumpinee Stadium || Bangkok, Thailand ||  Decision || 5 || 3:00

|-  style="background:#cfc;"
| 1987-02-06 || Win ||align=left| Petchan Sakwicha || Lumpinee Stadium || Bangkok, Thailand || Decision || 5 || 3:00
|-
! style=background:white colspan=9 |

|-  style="background:#fbb;"
| 1986-12-19 || Loss ||align=left| Wangchannoi Sor Palangchai ||Huamark Stadium Roman vs Payakaroon  || Bangkok, Thailand || Decision || 5 || 3:00 
|-
! style=background:white colspan=9 |

|-  style="background:#cfc;"
| 1986-11-25 || Win||align=left| Petchan Sakwicha || Lumpinee Stadium || Bangkok, Thailand || Decision || 5 || 3:00
|-
! style=background:white colspan=9 |

|-  style="background:#fbb;"
| 1986-08-22 || Loss||align=left| Wangchannoi Sor Palangchai || Lumpinee Stadium || Bangkok, Thailand || Decision || 5 || 3:00

|-  style="background:#fbb;"
| 1986-03-28 || Loss||align=left| Dejsak Payaksakda || Lumpinee Stadium || Bangkok, Thailand || Decision || 5 || 3:00

|-  style="background:#fbb;"
| 1986-03-04 || Loss||align=left| Petchchan Sakwicha || Lumpinee Stadium || Bangkok, Thailand || Decision || 5 || 3:00

|-  style="background:#cfc;"
| 1985-12-31 || Win ||align=left| Langsuan Panyuthaphum|| Lumpinee Stadium || Bangkok, Thailand || Decision || 5 || 3:00
|-  style="background:#fbb;"
| 1985-11-29 || Loss ||align=left| Yodmanut Sityodtong || Lumpinee Stadium || Bangkok, Thailand || Decision || 5 || 3:00

|-  style="background:#cfc;"
| 1985-10-11 || Win ||align=left| Seksan Sitchomthong|| Lumpinee Stadium || Bangkok, Thailand || Decision || 5 || 3:00
|-
! style=background:white colspan=9 |
|-  style="background:#cfc;"
| 1985-08-27 || Win ||align=left| Pinphet Sor Samipak|| Lumpinee Stadium || Bangkok, Thailand || Decision || 5 || 3:00
|-
| colspan=9 | Legend:

References

1969 births
2016 deaths
Namphon Nongkeepahuyuth
Namphon Nongkeepahuyuth
Flyweight kickboxers
Featherweight kickboxers
Lightweight kickboxers
Deaths from pneumonia in Thailand